Rund um die Nürnberger Altstadt is an elite men's and women's professional road bicycle racing event held each September in the old town section of Nuremberg, Germany.

Past winners

Women 
The women's event was part of the UCI Women's Road World Cup between 2003 and 2009.

Men 
The men's event is part of the UCI Europe Tour and is UCI rated 1.1.

Sport in Nuremberg
Cycle races in Germany
UCI Europe Tour races
UCI Women's Road World Cup
Women's road bicycle races
Recurring sporting events established in 1991
1991 establishments in Germany
Recurring sporting events established in 2001
2001 establishments in Germany